243 or variant, may refer to:

 243 (number)

Date and time
 AD 243 CE, a year
 243 BC/BCE, a year

 March 24 (24/3)

Places
 243 Ida, a main-belt asteroid, the 243rd asteroid registered
 243P/NEAT (Comet NEAT 243), a periodic comet, the 243rd periodical registered
 Lebo–Waverly USD 243, Kansas, USA; a unified school district, #243
 NA-243 (Karachi East-II), Pakistan; a national assembly constituency
 Collholme No. 243, Alberta, Canada; a municipal district

Transportation
 ARO-243, a 4x4 offroad vehicle from ARO (Auto Romania)
 DR Class 243, German electric locomotive class
 Tupolev Tu-243, Soviet unmanned reconnaissance aircraft
 Highway 243, several highways
 Flight 243 (disambiguation), several airline flights

Ships with pennant 243
 , a British Royal Navy River-class frigate
 , a British WWII Royal Navy S-class submarine
 , a WWII Indian Navy Bathurst-class corvette
 , a WWII U.S. Navy Clemson-class destroyer
 , a WWII U.S. Navy Edsall-class destroyer escort
 , a WWII U.S. Navy minesweeper
 , a WWII U.S. Navy Gato-class submarine
 , a WWII U.S. Navy auxiliary Boulder Victory-class cargo ship

Military units 243
 No. 243 Squadron RAF (UK)
 243rd Aviation Company, U.S. Army (USA)
 VMSB-243, Marine Scout Bombing Squadron (USA)
 243rd Air Traffic Control Squadron USAF (USA)
 243 Provost Company, Royal Military Police (UK)
 243 (The Wessex) Field Hospital, Royal Army Medical Corps (UK)
 243 Construction Squadron, Royal Engineers (UK)
 243rd Guards Motor Rifle Regiment, Red Army; a Soviet Cold War unit
 243rd Rifle Division, NKVD, Red Army; a Soviet unit in WWII
 243rd Static Infantry Division (Wehrmacht), WWII Germany
 243rd Coast Artillery (United States), Rhode Island National Guard interwar unit
 243d Aero Squadron, U.S. Army Air Corps, an interwar unit
 243rd Battalion, CEF, WWI Canadian Army unit
 243rd Infantry Division (German Empire), WWI

Weaponry
 M243 smoke grenade launcher (model 243)
 .243 calibre for firearms
 .243 Winchester rifle round
 .243 Winchester Super Short Magnum (.243 WSSM), rifle rounds

Communications
 +243; the calling code for the Democratic Republic of the Congo, the country once known as Zaire.
 243 AM, 243 kHz in AM radio
 243 MHz (UHF Guard frequency), an aircraft emergency frequency for military aircraft.

Isotope 243 
 Americium-243
 Berkelium-243
 Californium-243
 Curium-243
 Einsteinium-243
 Neptunium-243

Other uses
 United Nations Security Council Resolution 243

See also